The Puerto Rico Department of Public Safety (PR DPS) is the umbrella organization within the  Executive branch of Puerto Rico that agglomerates the Puerto Rico Law Enforcement and Emergency Response agencies in the U.S. Commonwealth of Puerto Rico.
The department was formed on April 10, 2017, when former governor Ricardo Rosselló signed the law to unify all safety agencies. All agencies are bureaus of the department.

Agencies overseen
The following agencies are under the umbrella organization of the department. All of these agencies have their own director or commissioner:

 Puerto Rico Police Bureau
 Puerto Rico Firefighters Bureau
 Medical Emergency Bureau
 Bureau for Emergency and Disaster Management
 Puerto Rico Special Investigations Bureau
 9-1-1 Bureau
The Puerto Rico Forensic Sciences Institute was part of the Department for three years until it once again became an independent agency.

List of secretaries
2017 - May 2019: Héctor Pesquera
May 2019 - December 2019: Elmer Román
December 2019 - January 2021: Pedro Janer
January 2021 - present: Alexis Torres

References

External links
 Official website 

Executive departments of the government of Puerto Rico
Law enforcement in Puerto Rico
Government agencies established in 2017
2017 establishments in Puerto Rico